João Francisco de Castro (born 10 December 1907, date of death unknown) was a Brazilian rower. He competed in the men's coxed four event at the 1932 Summer Olympics.

References

1907 births
Year of death missing
Brazilian male rowers
Olympic rowers of Brazil
Rowers at the 1932 Summer Olympics
Rowers from Rio de Janeiro (city)